Operation Lion was formed to establish an intelligence centre on central Sulawesi (called Celebes at the time). First Lieutenant I.H.T. Hees, 1st Cl. Lieutenant Hees had previously worked as an engineer for the department of public works and it was hoped he could contact one of his "mandoers" (overseers). The party was contacted by radio on 7 November 1942, however their signals were too weak to be received. On 14 December 1942, two Dutch NCO's (from the NEI Section) were in Darwin awaiting movement to LION party, but it was suspected that LION had come under Japanese control they were not dispatched.

On 5 January 1945, a party of five Indonesians under the codename of Operation Apricot left Darwin to ascertain the fate of Operation Lion. The leader was captured; the remainder were evacuated by Catalina flying boat on 31 January 1945.

References

Bibliography 
 
 National Archives Australia (1942–1945) – [SRD (Services Reconnaissance Department) HQ] NEI [Netherlands East Indies] Section IASD [Inter-Allied Services Department].

Military operations involving the Netherlands
Military operations of World War II involving Australia